Ralf Hütter (born 20 August 1946) is a German musician and composer best known as the lead singer and keyboardist of Kraftwerk, which he founded with Florian Schneider in 1969. On May 12, 2021, Kraftwerk was announced as one of the inductees of the Rock and Roll Hall of Fame.

Biography
Hütter was born on 20 August 1946 in Krefeld, Germany. In 2009 he lived near Düsseldorf. Hütter also has a daughter named Elsa who also produces music. 

He met Florian Schneider while studying improvisation at the Robert Schumann Hochschule. He is a vegetarian. Hütter is a secretive musician who avoids interviews.

Cycling interests
Ralf Hütter is an enthusiastic cycling fan, a fact reflected in some of the band's work. It was widely claimed that, when he was on tour, the group's bus would drop off Hütter 100 miles away from the next venue and he would cycle the rest of the way, a story that Hütter later confirmed. The band members took up cycling when recording the album The Man-Machine in the late 1970s. Ralf Hütter had been looking for a new form of exercise. The single "Tour de France" includes sounds that follow this theme, including bicycle chains, gear mechanisms and the breathing of the cyclist. At the time of the single's release Ralf Hütter tried to persuade the rest of the band that they should record a whole album based around cycling. At the time this did not happen, but the project eventually was released as Tour de France Soundtracks in 2003.

Hütter was involved in a serious cycling accident in May or June 1982, during the initial period of recording for the 1986 album Electric Café. He was in a coma as a result.  Karl Bartos stated the first thing Hütter said when he awoke from his coma was "Where is my bicycle?", a story Hütter later disputed in a June 2009 interview in The Guardian.

References

1946 births
People from Krefeld
Living people
German keyboardists
Kraftwerk members
German record producers
German electronic musicians
German songwriters
German male singers
English-language singers from Germany
German experimental musicians
Robert Schumann Hochschule alumni
Synth-pop singers